The Kuwait women's national football team is the representative women's association football team of Kuwait. Its governing body is the Kuwait Football Association (KFA) and it competes as a member of the Asian Football Confederation (AFC).

Results

References

Women's national association football team results
Women's football
Football in Kuwait